Izaak Duffy (born 16 February 1989) is a Welsh rugby league footballer who currently plays for the West Wales Raiders in Kingstone Press League 1. He plays as prop.

Duffy is a Welsh international, playing in the 2014 European Championships, making his début against Scotland in Workington.

References

1989 births
Living people
South Wales Scorpions players
Gloucestershire All Golds players
Wales national rugby league team players
Rugby league props